La señora Muerte (released in English in the US as Madame Death and in the UK as The Death Woman) is a 1969 Mexican horror film directed by Jaime Salvador and starring John Carradine and Regina Torné.

Plot
When her elderly husband suddenly dies, and she in turn is affected by a condition that disfigures half of her face, Marlene (Regina Torné), a fashion entrepreneur, is forced to turn to Dr. Favel (John Carradine), a mad scientist who tells her that the solution to both predicaments is to bring him fresh blood from young women, for which Marlene turns into a serial killer.

Cast
John Carradine as Dr. Favel. In the Spanish-language release of the film, Carradine was dubbed to Spanish by Mexican actor Víctor Alcocer.
Regina Torné as Marlene
Elsa Cárdenas as Julie
Miguel Ángel Álvarez as Tony Winter
Isela Vega as Lisa
Víctor Junco as Andrés
Carlos Ancira as Laor

References

Bibliography
Quinlan, David. The Illustrated Directory of Film Stars. Hippocrene Books, 1981.
Quinlan, David. The Illustrated Encyclopedia of Movie Character Actors. Harmony Books, 1986.
Amador, María Luisa. Ayala Blanco, Jorge. Cartelera cinematográfica, 1960–1969. UNAM, 1986.
García Riera, Emilio. Historia documental del cine mexicano, Volumen 13. University of Guadalajara, 1992. 
Weaver, Tom; Mank, Gregory W. John Carradine: The Films. McFarland, 1999.

External links

1969 horror films
1969 films
Mexican horror films
Films directed by Jaime Salvador
1960s Mexican films